Ștefan Relu Mihalache (born on June 9, 1982 in Bucharest, Romania), better known by his stage name Connect-R, is a Romanian roma rapper, singer, producer and occasional actor, best known for his association with Romanian hip hop group R.A.C.L.A. early in his career and the successful solo career that followed his leaving of the group. He has been noted as having a baritone-range singing voice and an eclectic musical style.

Biography

Early life and career
Mihalache was born in mid-1982 in Bucharest and, by the age of 8, was a professional dancer as a member of the dance group Primăvara. By the age of 15, he had become involved with hip hop music and in 1997 recorded "Observ", the first track in his professional career. His ex-wife and him had a child together.

He was chosen by Disney Channel Romania to sing "Sunt legat în lanț" song from the animated series Phineas and Ferb.

He also sings in Romanian the main theme of the animated movie - Treasure Planet.

Discography

Studio albums
 Dacă dragostea dispare (2007)
 From Nothing to Something (2012)
 Drăgostit (2016)
 Slawbaz (2017)

Singles

References

1982 births
Living people
Musicians from Bucharest
Romanian rappers
Romanian Romani people
Romani musicians
Romani rappers
Eurovision Song Contest entrants of 2006
Eurovision Song Contest entrants for Moldova